Tom Pappas (born September 6, 1976, in Azalea, Oregon) is an American track & field decathlete.

Pappas won the gold medal at the 2003 World Championships held outside Paris, France and was rated number 1 in the world that year by Track & Field News. He is a four-time US champion (2000, 2002, 2003, 2006) and was the 1999 NCAA champion while attending the University of Tennessee. He finished fifth at the 2000 Olympic decathlon, and competed in but did not finish the decathlon due to a foot injury at the 2004 Olympic Games. His personal best in the decathlon is 8,784 points while winning the 2003 US Championships held at Stanford University, CA.

He won the 2003 Jesse Owens Award from USATF, signifying he was Athlete of the Year.

Tom Pappas is currently the co-owner of Lane 5 Crossfit in Eugene, Oregon.

He placed 3rd at the United States Olympic Trials in the Decathlon in Eugene, Oregon in July, 2008 to qualify for the Beijing Olympics in August.

Pappas also was unable to complete the decathlon in Beijing due to injury in 2008.

Achievements

Personal Bests

References

External links 

 

1976 births
American male decathletes
American people of Greek descent
Athletes (track and field) at the 2000 Summer Olympics
Athletes (track and field) at the 2004 Summer Olympics
Athletes (track and field) at the 2008 Summer Olympics
Olympic track and field athletes of the United States
Track and field athletes from Oregon
People from Douglas County, Oregon
Living people
World Athletics Championships medalists
Goodwill Games medalists in athletics
World Athletics Indoor Championships winners
World Athletics Championships winners
Competitors at the 2001 Goodwill Games